Kosturino (in Macedonian Костурино) is a village in the municipality of Strumica, North Macedonia. It used to be part of the former municipality of Kukliš.

The village and the mountains around it were the scene of the Battle of Kosturino between Bulgarians and Irish in December 1915.

Demographics
According to the 2002 census, the village had a total of 1,280 inhabitants. Ethnic groups in the village include:

Macedonians 1,276
Turks 1
Serbs 2
Others 1

References

Villages in Strumica Municipality